Stephen "Steve" Hardy (born 24 October 1974) is an English professional darts player who has played in Professional Darts Corporation events.

Known as The Nutcracker, Hardy qualified for the 2013 European Darts Open on the PDC European Tour, but lost his first round match to Paul Nicholson.

He also qualified for the UK Open on four occasions, reaching the last 64 in 2010.

References

External links

English darts players
1974 births
Living people
Professional Darts Corporation former tour card holders